

2005

See also
 2005 in Australia
 2005 in Australian television
 List of 2005 box office number-one films in Australia

2005
Australian
Films